Stary Burtyuk (İśke Börtök) is a rural locality (a village) in Novoburinsky Selsoviet, Krasnokamsky District, Bashkortostan, Russia. The population was 364 as of 2010. There are 4 streets.

Geography 
Stary Burtyuk is located 62 km southeast of Nikolo-Beryozovka (the district's administrative centre) by road. Novy Burtyuk is the nearest rural locality.

References 

Rural localities in Krasnokamsky District